Nadagamkarayo, is a 2021 Sri Lankan comedy-drama thriller romantic television series broadcast on Swarnavahini TV. It is directed by Jayaprakash Sivagurunathan, produced by Chamara Samarawickrama and written by Saddha Mangala Sooriyabandara. It aired every weekday from 9:30 pm to 10:00 pm onwards. It was broadcast from 18 January 2021 to 2 August 2022. It has received positive reviews from critics, with praise for the screenplay and performances, and rated as one of the most popular teledramas in Sri Lanka. A spin-off series Kolam Kuttama directed by Sivagurunathan and written by Sooriyabandara was started on 3 August 2022.

Summary 
Saraa and his rowdy gang join the village drama team despite their arrogant attitudes, and the rest of the villagers get annoyed especially Kukula Merchant and Mr. Secretary when the headmaster and Loku Hamuduruwo start to defend their unacceptable behavior.

Cast and characters

Main cast 
 Sajitha Anuththara as Sarath Kumara Gunaratne aka Saraa
 Prasannajith Abeysuriya as Ariyapala Rooparathna Master
 Giriraj Kaushalya as Kusumsiri Cabral aka Kukula Lakuna Mudalali
 Senali Fonseka as Patali aka Sudu Chooti, Master's elder daughter
 Kokila Pawan Jayasooriya as Nuwan Madushanka aka Marlon de Silva 
 Rahal Bulathsinhala as Loku Hamuduruwo  
 Sangeeth Prabhu as Sudath Sanjeewa aka Kawadiya, Saraa's right-hand-man and best friend

Supporting cast
 Dharmapriya Dias as Bindusiri Cabral, Kukula lakuna's brother
 Madushany Perera as Janaki Ameesha Cabral aka Jaanu 
 Viraj Danusha as Sudda, Saraa's friend
 Pasindu Vithanage as Kiri Putha, Saraa's friend
 Kasuni Kavindi Fernando as Rasika Gunaratne, Saraa's elder sister 
 Hashinika Karaliyadda as Sōma, Kukula Lakuna Mudalali's Wife
 Meena Kumari as Kusumalatha, Master's Wife 
 Nimmy Manohari as Anjali "Poddi", Master's younger daughter
 Ruwan Perera as Kekulandara
 Dayasiri Hettiarachchi as Mudalali
 Upatissa Balasuriya as S. K. Sirisena 
 Praveena Dissanayake as Geethika, Kawadiya's love interest
 Sharad Chanduma as Rathne

Minor cast
 Sashmitha Dilshan as Gajaman
 Ananda Athukorale as Police officer
 Ranjan Suriyakumara as Police officer
 Piyal Sylvester as Lekam 
 Dulanja Dilshan as Nanda Sirimalwatta, the Provincial Councilor 
 Sachintha Randeepa as Podi Hamuduruwo
 Nipuni Poojitha as Geethani miss, the development officer 
 Manuja Jayakody as Thiyogabadu
 Wasana Bandara as Suranga 
 Rupa Pathirana as Saraa's mother 
 Geethal Perera as Gunaratne, Sara's father
 Amandya Uthpali as Kalpana
 Buddhika Namal
 Sujeeva Wijetunga
 Salika Rukshan
 Raveen Ranmalith as Chutte
 Cheruka Weerakoon as Himself
 Pasindu Sampath as Layya
 Dulan Hettiarachchi as Podi Mudiyanse 
 Devinda Wickramasinghe as Jayantha, Rasika's disabled husband 
 Vihanga Malsara
 Subodha Buddhipriya
 Swaranjana Dissanayake 
 Supun Thathsara
 Shayani Bhagya
 Asiri Edirisinghe as Nadagam student
 Madara Sewwandi as Hansi
 Rehan Senadheera as Ananda
 Rishshan Pathirana
 Madushan Nanayakkara as Minister Suren Rajanayake
 Sampath Dadallage as Minister's MSD security

Reception 
The series stars Sajitha Anuththara Anthony and Senali Fonseka in lead roles with an ensemble cast of Sangeeth Prabhu, Kokila Pawan, Prasannajith Abesuriya, Rahal Bulathsinhala, and Giriraj Kaushalya. The series has received acclaim from critics and audiences alike, and all the telecast episodes were trending on YouTube, setting a record in Sri Lankan teledrama history. At the 2021 Sumathi Awards, the teledrama received awards for Popular Actor (Sajitha) and Popular Actress (Senali).

Upon release, It has received acclaim from critics and audiences alike, with particular praise for the screenplay and performances of the cast. It is one of the most-watched and successful teledramas in Sri Lanka. However the 400th and final episode of the serial received negative reviews from critics and fans where some people accuse it of leaving the audience confused towards the end. Some viewers who loved the serial said that it drowned out the characters of some of the actors and actresses who acted in the teledrama with a dead end.

In February 2021, the drama team announced that that lead cast, Sajitha Anuththara, Sangeeth Prabhu and Kokila Pawan, had been infected with COVID-19. As a result, the serial has suspended shooting for a brief period.

Actor Ruwan Perera received death threats in July 2021 after the show depicted Sara (Sajitha Anthony) being hospitalized after being hit by Kekulandara (Perera) with a machete was broadcast. Sajitha Anthony, who plays Sara, has released a video on social media saying that do not overly sensitive to the serial and its characters in reality.

Awards

Sumathi Awards

|-
|| 2021 ||| Sajitha Anuththara || Most Popular Teledrama Actor || 
|-
|| 2021 ||| Senali Fonseka || Most Popular Teledrama Actress ||

SLIM-Kantar Peoples Awards

|-
|| 2022 ||| Sajitha Anuththara || Most Popular Teledrama Actor || 
|-
|| 2022 ||| Nadagamkarayo || Most Popular Teledrama ||

Raigam Tele'es

|-
|| 2022 ||| Nadagamkarayo || Janagatha Teledrama Award ||

Soundtrack

References 

Sri Lankan television shows
2021 Sri Lankan television series debuts
Swarnavahini original programming